The Philippines national basketball team in 2013 was led by head coach Chot Reyes. The national team finished second at the 2013 FIBA Asia Championship gaining one of the three Asian berths for the 2014 FIBA Basketball World Cup. The Philippines secured its place at the FIBA World Cup after 36 years of absence.

Tournaments

Dubai Invitational Basketball Tournament

Group stage

Quarterfinal

Super Kung Sheung Cup

Group stage

Semifinal

Final

FIBA Asia Championship

Group stage

Second round

Quarterfinals

Semifinals

Final

Southeast Asian Games

Exhibition games

Roster

References 

Philippines men's national basketball team results
2012–13 in Philippine basketball
2013–14 in Philippine basketball